Kalos may refer to:
 Kalos kagathos the good and the virtuous - the greek ethos of human excellence, or arete
 Kalos, the region found in Pokémon X and Y
 Kalos inscription, the form of epigraph found on Attic vases and graffiti in antiquity
 Daewoo Kalos, the original marketed name for the Chevrolet Aveo (T200)
 Kalos Agros, an ancient Roman town

See also